Knee Lake Airport  is located  north of Knee Lake, Manitoba, Canada.

See also
Knee Lake Water Aerodrome

References

Registered aerodromes in Manitoba